Kevin Melvyn Curren (born 2 March 1958) is a South African former professional tennis player. He played in two Grand Slam singles finals and won four Grand Slam doubles titles, reaching a career-high singles ranking of world No. 5 in July 1985. During his career he won 5 singles and 16 doubles titles.

Personal life
Curren was born in South Africa, and he became a naturalized American citizen in April 1985.

Tennis career

Curren played both tennis and cricket at Glenwood High School in Durban. He also quickly rose among the ranks as a junior at Montclair Lawn Tennis Club in Montclair, Durban. At college he played tennis for the University of Texas at Austin in the United States and won the NCAA singles title in 1979. He turned professional later that year, and won his first top-level singles title in 1981 in Johannesburg.

In 1983, Curren reached his first Grand Slam semifinal at Wimbledon, beating defending champion, Jimmy Connors in the fourth round, snapping Connors' streak of 27 consecutive major quarterfinals appearances. It went on to be his only 4th round loss in 35 Grand Slam tournaments appearances. Curren lost to unseeded New Zealander Chris Lewis in a five-set semifinal match which allowed Lewis to become only the seventh unseeded player to reach the Wimbledon final. In 1984, Curren  played Mats Wilander in the final of the Australian Open, after making a comeback from two sets down to defeat Ben Testerman in the semifinals. Wilander won the match, played on the grass courts at Kooyong, in four sets.

In 1985, after becoming an American citizen, Curren reached the final at Wimbledon with the help of coaching from Tony Roche. After defeating Larry Stefanki, Mike De Palmer, David Mustard and then future champion Stefan Edberg in the fourth round in straight sets, he eliminated the then-world No. 1, John McEnroe, in the quarterfinals, and world No. 3 Jimmy Connors, in the semifinals. Curren was the first player to beat both American players in the same Grand Slam event. McEnroe commented that he felt overpowered and later that he had difficulty in dealing with Curren's highly individualistic and very fast serving, which, in its low toss, was hard to read and tended to produce low balls that skipped on the grass courts of the time. In the final, he lost in four sets to Boris Becker, in a match best remembered for making the 17-year-old Becker the youngest male Grand Slam champion (a record which was later eclipsed by Michael Chang in 1989 at the French Open). The final was intense, and Becker sent several hostile glares to Curren before and after points. On one of the final change-overs, Becker bumped Curren's shoulder as they passed one another. After his defeat, Curren was noted as saying that he thought the game would see an increase in the number of successful young players and predicted that they would have more intense, but shorter careers. Curren was the last American man to reach the final at Wimbledon until Andre Agassi did so seven years later in 1992.

Though he never won a Grand Slam singles title, Curren did win four Grand Slam doubles titles. In 1981, he won the US Open mixed doubles, and in 1982 he won the Wimbledon mixed doubles and both men's doubles and mixed doubles at the US Open. During his career, Curren won five top-level singles titles and 26 doubles titles. His career-high rankings were world No. 5 in singles and world No. 3 in doubles. His final career singles title came in 1989 at Frankfurt, and his last doubles title was won in 1992 in Seoul. Curren retired from the professional tour in 1993.

Since retiring from the tour, Curren has served as captain of the South Africa Davis Cup team.

Grand Slam finals

Singles: 2 (2 runner-ups)

Doubles: 1 (1 title)

Mixed doubles: 3 (3 titles)

ATP career finals

Singles: 13 (5 titles, 8 runner-ups)

Doubles: 53 (26 titles, 27 runner-ups)

Grand Slam singles performance timeline

References

External links
 
 

1958 births
Living people
American male tennis players
South African people of British descent
Sportspeople from Durban
South African emigrants to the United States
South African male tennis players
Tennis players from Austin, Texas
Texas Longhorns men's tennis players
US Open (tennis) champions
White South African people
Wimbledon champions
Grand Slam (tennis) champions in mixed doubles
Grand Slam (tennis) champions in men's doubles